Khosro (Hosrov) Sheikh Harandi (1 September 1950 – 8 January 2019) was the first Iranian chess International Master and 3-time Iran chess champion. He was a member of the national team in five Chess Olympiads.

 In 1970, at fourth board in 19th Chess Olympiad in Siegen (+6 –3 =10); 
 In 1972, at first board in 20th Chess Olympiad in Skopje (+8 –3 =11); 
 In 1974, at first board in 21st Chess Olympiad in Nice (+10 –6 =4); 
 In 1976, at second board in 22nd Chess Olympiad in Haifa (+5 –3 =5); 
 In 1990, at first board in 29th Chess Olympiad in Novi Sad (+4 –3 =6). 

He represented Iran at first board in 19th World Student Team Chess Championship at Graz 1972 (+6 –3 =3). 

Harandi won twice zonal FIDE tournaments held in Tehran (1975 and 1978). He tied for 18-20th at Manila 1976 (interzonal; Henrique Mecking won). In 1977, he tied for 1st-3rd in Netanya. In 1978, he tied for 4-5th in Baguio. In 1979, he took 15th place in Rio de Janeiro (interzonal; Lajos Portisch, Tigran Petrosian and Robert Hübner won). 

He was awarded the International Master title in 1975 and FIDE Senior Trainer title in 2009.

References

External links
Khosro Harandi at Chessgames.com

1950 births
2019 deaths
Iranian chess players
Chess International Masters
Chess coaches
Chess Olympiad competitors
20th-century Iranian people
21st-century Iranian people